Cosmo Joseph Iacavazzi (some sources say Cosmo Iacovazzi, born August 18, 1943) is a former American football player.  A fullback, he played college football at Princeton University and was a member of the Tiger Inn eating club. He was inducted into the College Football Hall of Fame in 2002.

After graduating from Princeton, he was drafted by the Minnesota Vikings of the National Football League (NFL), but played professionally in the American Football League (AFL) for the New York Jets in 1965; Iacavazzi was on the roster for two games. He also played for the Scranton Miners of the Atlantic Coast Football League in 1965 and the Seattle Rangers of the Continental Football League in 1967. 

The street block in front of West Scranton High School was renamed Cosmo Iacavazzi Way before the 2005 football season.

Iacavazzi, the Princeton graduate, is the third "Cosmo" in the Iacavazzi  family.  Cosmo the first, was the graduate's grandfather, who had three sons.  Peter, who was the graduate's father, and Cosmo, Jr., the graduate's uncle.  The Scranton Miner's team was owned by Cosmo Iacavazzi, Jr.
The family name, Iacavazzi, is spelled both Iacavazzi and Iacovazzi, depending which side of the family is using the name.

See also
 List of American Football League players
 List of NCAA major college football yearly scoring leaders

External links
 
 
 NFL.com profile

1943 births
Living people
American football halfbacks
American football fullbacks
New York Jets players
Princeton Tigers football players
College Football Hall of Fame inductees
Sportspeople from Scranton, Pennsylvania
Players of American football from  Pennsylvania
American Football League players